Bailey Banfield (born 26 February 1998) is a professional Australian rules footballer playing for the Fremantle Football Club in the Australian Football League (AFL).

Early life 
Banfield grew up in Broome, Western Australia and attended Scotch College, Perth. He lived there until he finished Year 7. After year 7 he boarded at Scotch College.

AFL career
Overlooked in the 2016 AFL draft, Banfield played for Claremont in the West Australian Football League (WAFL), being a part of the Colts (WAFL) premiership side in 2015 and winning their 2017 best and fairest award.  He was then selected by Fremantle with their first selection, fifth overall, in the 2018 AFL rookie draft.

Banfield made his AFL debut for Fremantle in the opening round of the 2018 AFL season after a series of impressive pre-season games. He signed a two-year contract extension, tying him to Fremantle until 2020. Banfield was elevated to the senior list in 2019. Banfield had a standout performance during round 12 of the 2022 AFL season kicking a career-high four goals during Fremantle's 14 point win over the Brisbane Lions.

Statistics
 Statistics are correct to the end of round 13 2022

|- style="background-color: #EAEAEA"
! scope="row" style="text-align:center" | 2018
|
| 41 || 20 || 5 || 5 || 162 || 129 || 291 || 65 || 81 || 0.3 || 0.3 || 8.1 || 6.5 || 14.6 || 3.3 || 4.1
|-
! scope="row" style="text-align:center" | 2019
|
| 41 || 7 || 2 || 1 || 39 || 54 || 93 || 18 || 30 || 0.3 || 0.1 || 5.6 || 7.7 || 13.3 || 2.6 || 4.3
|- style="background-color: #EAEAEA"
! scope="row" style="text-align:center"| 2020
|
| 41 || 5 || 2 || 0 || 26 || 21 || 47 || 8 || 18 || 0.4 || 0.0 || 5.2 || 4.2 || 9.4 || 1.6 || 3.6
|-
! scope="row" style="text-align:center" | 2021
|
| 41 || 6 || 4 || 2 || 29 || 27 || 56 || 12 || 14 || 0.7 || 0.3 || 4.8 || 4.5 || 9.3 || 2.0 || 2.3
|- style="background-color: #EAEAEA"
! scope="row" style="text-align:center" | 2022
|
| 41 || 13 || 12 || 9 || 64 || 26 || 90 || 28 || 19 || 0.9 || 0.6 || 4.9 || 2.0 || 6.9 || 2.1 || 1.4
|- class="sortbottom"
! colspan=3| Career
! 51
! 25
! 17
! 320
! 257
! 577
! 131
! 162
! 0.49
! 0.33
! 6.27
! 5.03
! 11.3
! 2.56
! 3.17
|}

Notes

References

External links

 

WAFL Player Profile and Statistics

1998 births
Living people
Fremantle Football Club players
Claremont Football Club players
Australian rules footballers from Western Australia
People educated at Scotch College, Perth
Peel Thunder Football Club players